Otterson may refer to:

 Billy Otterson (1862–1940), baseball player
 Jack Otterson (1905–1991), art director
 Joel Otterson (born 1959), artist
 John E. Otterson (1881–1964), American engineer and business executive 
 Michael Otterson, managing director of Public Affairs for The Church of Jesus Christ of Latter-day Saints
 Ryan Otterson (born 1986), football offensive tackle